Kevin Malthus de Sousa Ribeiro (born 11 January 2003), known as Kevin Malthus or simply Malthus, is a Brazilian footballer who plays as a midfielder for Santos.

Club career
Born in Belém, Pará, Malthus moved to Santos, São Paulo at the age of ten, and subsequently joined Santos' youth setup. In December 2020, after Carlos Sánchez was sidelined due to injury, he was registered in the 2020 Copa Libertadores list for Peixe in his place.

Malthus made his professional debut on 28 February 2021, starting in a 2–2 Campeonato Paulista away draw against Santo André. On 29 April, he renewed his contract until March 2026.

On his Copa Libertadores debut on 4 May 2021, Malthus scored his first professional goal by netting the fifth in a 5–0 home routing over The Strongest. He made his Série A debut on 6 June, coming on as a late substitute for Marcos Guilherme in a 3–1 home win against Ceará.

On 3 August 2021, Malthus suffered a serious knee injury, being sidelined for the remainder of the season. Upon returning, he trained with the under-20s before suffering the same injury in April 2022.

In March 2023, after 19 months sidelined, Malthus returned to action with the under-20 team.

Career statistics

References

External links
Santos FC profile 

2003 births
Living people
Sportspeople from Belém
Brazilian footballers
Association football midfielders
Campeonato Brasileiro Série A players
Santos FC players